Holly Marie Combs Ryan (born December 3, 1973) is an American actress and producer. She is known for her roles as Kimberly Brock in the CBS series Picket Fences (1992–1996), Piper Halliwell in The WB series Charmed (1998–2006) and Ella Montgomery in the Freeform series Pretty Little Liars (2010–2017).

Early life
Combs was born in San Diego, California, and is of Irish descent. At the time of her birth, her mother, Lauralei Combs was 15 years old, and her father was 17. Combs' biological parents married, but the two split up after two years, feeling they were too young to make a marriage work.

While Combs was learning to walk, she fell and hit her head on a marble table, resulting in a noticeable 'split' at the top of her right eyebrow. She lived in many different homes with her mother, near the beach in San Diego, often having very little privacy, while her mother attempted to pursue an acting career. When Combs was seven, she and her mother moved to New York City where she spent most of her growing years. Combs was 12 when her mother married her stepfather. In New York City, Combs attended Beekman Hill Elementary and then the Professional Children's School. In an interview when she was in Sydney, Australia, for Supanova Expo, she said that she was a certified scuba diver at 13.

Career

Early work: 1988–1997

When she was 14 years old, Combs landed her first major role in Sweet Hearts Dance (1988), a comedy drama film directed by Robert Greenwald. She played Debs Boon, the daughter of Wiley Boon (played by Don Johnson) and Sandra Boon (played by Susan Sarandon). Her next major role was in Oliver Stone's Born on the Fourth of July (1989), a film adaptation of the best selling autobiography of the same name by Vietnam War veteran Ron Kovic. Combs portrayed Jenny in the film, which also starred Tom Cruise. Her other roles included Helena in the 1989 anthology film New York Stories, and Kim Fields in Hal Hartley's Simple Men (1992). Also in 1992, Combs made an appearance in Temístocles López's Chain of Desire as Diana, and in the slasher film Dr. Giggles, in which she played Jennifer Campbell, the 19-year-old daughter of Tom Campbell (played by Cliff De Young) and girlfriend of Max Anderson (played by Glenn Quinn).

Combs's first major breakthrough as an actress came at the age of 18, in the CBS television series Picket Fences. She portrayed Kimberly Brock, the daughter of Sheriff Jimmy Brock (played by Tom Skerritt) and his first wife Lydia for the show's four seasons (1992–96). Jimmy's second wife, Dr. Jill Brock (played by Kathy Baker), was  her stepmother.  Combs auditioned for the role in New York. The casting agent told her that she wasn't right for the part because she "didn't have a big enough heart." Combs retorted, "If you're looking for someone with a big heart, what the hell are you doing in New York?". She was later called back and offered the job. Combs won a Young Artist Award for her performance on the show. During 1996, Combs starred as Sophie DiMatteo in Sins of Silence, a drama/horror television film directed by Sam Pillsbury. The following year, Combs portrayed real-life convicted murderer Diane Zamora in the television film Love's Deadly Triangle: The Texas Cadet Murder, and appeared in the fact-based drama film Daughters as Alex Morell, one of the two daughters of a murdered heiress.

Later work: 1998–present 
In 1998, Combs landed a lead role in The WB television series Charmed, in which she portrayed Piper Halliwell, the middle of three sisters who are witches. Following Shannen Doherty's departure after season three (2000–01), Combs's character became the eldest sister for the remaining five seasons of the show. Combs also became a producer for Charmed from season five onwards. The series ended its eight-season run on May 21, 2006. In 2007 and 2008, AOL named Combs's character Piper the third greatest witch in television history. Combs was the only cast member to appear in every episode of the series, including the original unaired pilot.

During Charmed, Combs made an uncredited cameo appearance in Steven Soderbergh's Ocean's Eleven (2001), and starred opposite Charisma Carpenter in the romantic comedy film See Jane Date (2003), portraying the role of "a struggling actress whose career benefits from an affair with an A-list actor." In 2007, she starred in the Lifetime television film Point of Entry (also titled Panic Button) as Kathy Alden, a wife and mother of a single child whose family moves to a "beautiful and supposedly secure gated community after she's the victim of a violent house break-in." The following year, Combs signed a contract with Lifetime to produce and star in a series Mistresses, based on the British series of the same name. However, that version of the show never made it to air. (ABC later made a version featuring Combs's former Charmed co-star Alyssa Milano.) In 2010, Combs was cast in the Freeform series Pretty Little Liars as Ella Montgomery, the mother of one of the main characters, Aria Montgomery (played by Lucy Hale). Combs was a series regular for the first three seasons, but became credited as a special guest star from season four onwards. Pretty Little Liars ended after seven seasons, and Combs returned for the show's final episode on June 27, 2017.

Combs and Doherty starred in their own road trip reality show Off the Map with Shannen & Holly, which premiered on Great American Country on January 2, 2015. The six-episode series followed the pair traveling across southeastern United States, with stops in Kentucky, Tennessee, Mississippi, Alabama, Georgia and Florida. Viewers were able to vote on activities Doherty and Combs would partake in at each destination on Great American Country's official website. In January 2016, Combs starred in the Hallmark Channel television film Love's Complicated, playing the lead role of Leah Townsend, a big city novel writer and senator's daughter who is "known for being a people pleaser."

Personal life 
In 1993, Combs married actor Bryan Travis Smith; they divorced in 1997.

On February 14, 2004, she married her long time boyfriend and the former Charmed key-grip David Donoho. They have three sons together. In November 2011, she filed for divorce from Donoho, citing irreconcilable differences.

In 2016, Combs began dating restaurateur Mike Ryan. On September 3, 2017, Combs announced their engagement. On September 7, 2019 it was reported that they married in Carmel, California.

Filmography

Film

Television

Internet

Producer

Awards and nominations

References

External links

 

1973 births
Living people
20th-century American actresses
21st-century American actresses
Actresses from New York City
Actresses from San Diego
American child actresses
American film actresses
American people of Irish descent
American soap opera actresses
American television actresses
Television producers from California
Television producers from New York City
American women television producers